Martine Abdallah-Pretceille is a French scholar who has contributed to renewing thinking on interculturality since the 1980s. She is Professor Emeritus at the University of Paris VIII and was made Chevalier de la Légion d’Honneur in 2009.

She wrote a PhD under the guidance of Louis Porcher.

Bibliography 
 (dir.), Les métamorphoses de l'identité, Paris, Economica, 2006 
 L'éducation interculturelle, PUF, Collection : « Que sais-je ? » n° 3487, 2004 
 Former et éduquer en contexte hétérogène. : Pour un humanisme du divers, Paris, Economica, 2003 
 with Louis Porcher, Éducation et communication interculturelle [2e éd.] - Paris, PUF, 2001 (Éducation et formation - L'éducateur) 
 Vers une pédagogie interculturelle, Paris, Anthropos, 1999 
 with Louis Porcher, Diagonales de la communication interculturelle, Paris, Anthropos, 1999 
 with Louis Porcher, Éducation et communication interculturelle, Anthropos, Collection « Exploration interculturelle et science sociale », 1999 
 with Louis Porcher, Diagonales de la communication interculturelle, Paris, Economica, 1999 
 Maîtriser les écrits du quotidien, Paris, Retz, 1998, 
 (dir.), Quelle école pour quelle intégration ? Paris, CNDP, Hachette éducation, 1992. (Ressources formation)

References

French sociologists
French women sociologists
Academic staff of Paris 8 University Vincennes-Saint-Denis
Living people
Year of birth missing (living people)